Jamil Ahmad may refer to:

 Jamil Ahmad (writer) (1931–2014), Pakistani novelist and story writer
 Jamil Uddin Ahmad (1936–1975), officer in the Bangladesh Army